Kuban Stadium is a multi-purpose stadium in Krasnodar, Russia. It is used mostly for football matches and is the home stadium of resurrected FC Kuban Krasnodar and FC Urozhay Krasnodar. The stadium holds 35,200 people. The stadium was opened on 30 October 1960.

When built, the stadium had a capacity of 20,000. Later a second tier for additional 20,000 people was added and floodlights installed. First football match on Kuban Stadium was held on 14 May 1961, when Spartak Krasnodar played FC Spartak Stavropol.

See also
List of football stadiums in Russia

References

External links
 Kuban Stadium picture
 Kuban Stadium 
 Groundhopping page

Sports venues completed in 1960
Sports venues built in the Soviet Union
Football venues in Russia
FC Kuban Krasnodar
Multi-purpose stadiums in Russia
FC Krasnodar
Buildings and structures in Krasnodar
Sport in Krasnodar
Rugby union stadiums in Russia
Kubanochka Krasnodar
FC Urozhay Krasnodar